Nebraska Highway 59 is a highway in northeastern Nebraska. The western segment of Nebraska Highway 59 has a western terminus at Nebraska Highway 14 west of Creighton and an eastern terminus at U.S. Highway 81 northeast of Magnet. The eastern segment of Highway 59 has its western terminus at Nebraska Highway 57 south of Coleridge and its eastern terminus at U.S. Highway 20 north of Laurel.

Route description

Western segment
Nebraska Highway 59 begins at Nebraska Highway 14 west of Creighton.  It continues east into farmland and through Creighton, then intersects Nebraska Highway 13.  It continues due east and intersects Nebraska Highway 121 south of Wausa before ending northeast of Magnet at U.S. Highway 81.

Eastern segment
The eastern segment of Nebraska Highway 59 begins at Nebraska Highway 57 south of Coleridge and north of Belden.  It goes straight east through farmland to the intersection of Nebraska Highway 15 and U.S. Highway 20 north of Laurel, where it ends.

History
Prior to November 2001, the current eastern segment of Nebraska Highway 59 was an overlap of Nebraska Highway 15 and Nebraska Highway 57.  That month, the two highways were swapped and the eastern segment of Nebraska Highway 59 was created.

Major intersections

References

External links

Nebraska Roads: NE 41-60

059
Transportation in Knox County, Nebraska
Transportation in Cedar County, Nebraska